Pope's writhing skink (Riopa popae) is a species of skink found in Myanmar.

References

Riopa
Reptiles described in 1940
Reptiles of Myanmar
Endemic fauna of Myanmar
Taxa named by Benjamin Shreve
Taxobox binomials not recognized by IUCN